CRKSV Jong Holland is a  Curaçao football team based in Willemstad and playing in the First Division of Curaçao liga MCB.

Achievements
Netherlands Antilles Championship: 1
 1977
Curaçao League: 9
 1926, 1928, 1932, 1935, 1937, 1940, 1943, 1981, 1999

Performance in CONCACAF competitions
CONCACAF Champions' Cup: 3 appearances

CONCACAF Champions Cup 1978 – First Round – (Caribbean Zone) – Lost to  SV Transvaal 4 – 2 in the global result.
CONCACAF Champions Cup 1979 – Second Round – (Caribbean Zone) – Lost to  Defence Force 2 – 0 in the global result.
CONCACAF Champions Cup 1985 – Third Round – (Caribbean Zone) – Lost to  USL Montjoly 4 – 0 in the global result.

Current squad 2021-22

2022 Caribbean Club Shield

International friendly matches
7 October 1941 – CRKSV Jong Holland 2 – 1  Feyenoord
24 December 1944 – CRKSV Jong Holland 4 – 4  Litoral OSP
27 December 1944 – CRKSV Jong Holland 1 – 3  Deportivo Venezuela
29 December 1944 – CRKSV Jong Holland 3 – 2  Deportivo Venezuela
7 December 1968 – CRKSV Jong Holland 4 – 1  Caracas FC
25 October 1980 – CRKSV Jong Holland 0 – 0  Deportivo Galicia
27 October 1980 – CRKSV Jong Holland 0 – 1  Deportivo Galicia
25 October 1981 – CRKSV Jong Holland 2 – 4  Zamora FC
27 October 1981 – CRKSV Jong Holland 2 – 2  Zamora FC

Managers
  Henry Caldera (2012–13)
  Marc van Eijk (2013–14)
  Leiton Maurits (2014–Present)

References

Football clubs in Curaçao
Football clubs in the Netherlands Antilles
Association football clubs established in 1919
CRKSV Jong Holland